Praed Point Battery was a coastal defence battery at Praed Point, East New Britain, Papua New Guinea during World War II. It was built in 1941, by Royal Australian Engineers of Lark Force, together with 'L' Coastal Defence Battery of the Royal Australian Artillery. The battery covered St. George's Channel and the approaches to Blanche Bay. Due to the topography of Praed Point, the guns were located at different levels down the hillside. The battery was commanded led by Major James Rowland Purcell Clark, and was equipped with two 6 inch Mk. VII naval guns, formerly from Wallace Battery, and two H.C.D. 90 cm Mk VI searchlights. The battery was destroyed on 22 January 1942 during a Japanese air raid, with the upper gun being blown off its mount and sliding down the slope knocking out the lower gun emplacement. Eleven men were killed in the attack.

Notes

References
 

Artillery units and formations of Australia
East New Britain Province
Papua New Guinea in World War II